Elfin Pertiwi Rappa (born September 23, 1995 in Palembang, South Sumatera) is an Indonesian beauty pageant titleholder who was crowned Puteri Indonesia Lingkungan 2014, and represented Indonesia at the Miss International 2014 pageant and achieve a Top 10 position and won Best National Costume.

Early life
Elfin was born in Palembang, South Sumatera, Indonesia, to Indo father and Indonesian mother. She holds a bachelor degree in Business Management from Sriwijaya University. Working as well as a model, she reached number of achievements in that field. Elfin was the winner of Cover Guest Aneka Yess Magazine 2009, was the Brand Ambassador at Cardinal Awards 2010, was placed in Top 3 of Star Teen High End Teen Magazine 2011, was placed in Top 3 of Model of Indonesia 2012, the winner of Gadis  Palembang 2012 or Miss Teen Palembang 2012 and Gadis South Sumatera 2013.

Pageantry

Puteri Sumatera Selatan 2013
Elfin was crowned Puteri Sumatera Selatan 2013 and would represent Sumatera Selatan at Puteri Indonesia 2014.

Puteri Indonesia 2014
Elfin represented Sumatera Selatan and eventually finished as first runner-up to Elvira Devinamira and crowned as Puteri Indonesia Lingkungan 2014. She then represented Indonesia at upcoming Miss International 2014.

Miss International 2014
As Puteri Indonesia Lingkungan 2014, Elfin represented Indonesia at the 54th edition of Miss International 2014 in Tokyo, Japan where she placed in the Top 10 in addition to winning a special award of Best National Costume, Elfin's national costume using "Sigar Lampung" from Lampung and Batik as a theme and the main component.

See also 

 Puteri Indonesia 2014
 Miss International 2014
 Elvira Devinamira Wirayanti
 Lily Estelita Liana

References

External links
 Puteri Indonesia Official Website
 Miss International Official Website
 Elfin Pertiwi Rappa Official Instagram

Living people
1995 births
Indo people
Puteri Indonesia winners
Miss International 2014 delegates
Indonesian female models
Indonesian beauty pageant winners
Indonesian Muslims
Indonesian people of Portuguese descent
People from South Sumatra
People from Palembang
Sriwijaya University alumni